HD 218108, also known as HR 8786, is a solitary, white hued star located in the southern circumpolar constellation Octans. It has an apparent magnitude of 6.11, making it faintly visible to the naked eye under ideal conditions. Based on parallax measurements from Gaia DR3, the object is estimated to be 247 light years away. Paunzen et al. (2001) lists it as a λ Boötis star with a weak magnesium line.

HD 218108 has a stellar classification of A6 Vn, indicating that it is an A-type main-sequence star with broad or nebulous absorption lines due to rapid rotation. In 1966, David Stanley Evans gave it a slightly cooler class of A7 Vn. However, Houk and Cowley (1975) give it a classification of A3/4 V, a main sequence star with the characteristics of an A3 and A4 star. Paunzen et al. (2001) gives it a class of A3 V, indicating that it is instead an ordinary A-type main-sequence star.

Nevertheless, it has 1.8 times the mass of the Sun and twice its radius. A solar metallicity was calculated for HD 218108.

References

A-type main-sequence stars
Lambda Boötis stars
218108
Octans
114258
8786
PD-80 01064
Octantis, 79